Enemies and Allies is an accessory for the 3rd edition of the Dungeons & Dragons fantasy role-playing game.

Contents
Enemies and Allies contains statistics and descriptions for numerous non-player characters of various types for 3rd edition Dungeons & Dragons.

Publication history
Enemies and Allies was published in October 2001, and was designed by Bruce R. Cordell, Jeff Grubb, David Noonan, and Skip Williams. Cover art is by Jeff Easley, with interior art by Dennis Cramer, Todd Lockwood, Wayne Reynolds, and Sam Wood.

Reception
Shannon Appelcline notes that the NPC book Enemies and Allies was one of many early D&D third edition releases which "did not have a strong setting".

Reviews

References

Dungeons & Dragons sourcebooks
Role-playing game supplements introduced in 2001